Tristeirometa is a genus of moths in the family Geometridae.

Species
Tristeirometa auxostira (Prout, 1925)
Tristeirometa bathylima (Prout, 1932)
Tristeirometa benguetana (Schultze, 1910)
Tristeirometa bostryx (Prout, 1932)
Tristeirometa curvistriga (Warren, 1894)
Tristeirometa decussata (Moore, 1868)
Tristeirometa mesogrammata (Walker, 1863)

References
Natural History Museum Lepidoptera genus database

Trichopterygini